Claude Bédard (born 1952) is a translator and author of several works, including a teaching manual on English-French technical translation, La traduction technique : Principes et pratique (1986), which is still widely used by universities.

Bédard has lectured on technical translation and computer-assisted translation (CAT) tools and has published numerous articles on technical translation and on CAT. He is the driving force behind LogiTerm, as well as the programmer of its linguistic functions, and of LogiTrans, a text analysis and retrieval tool. In 2003, Bédard was awarded the OTTIAQ Award of Merit, offered by the Ordre des traducteurs, terminologues et interprètes agréés du Québec (OTTIAQ) in recognition of outstanding achievements or longstanding contributions throughout a career in the language profession. Bédard is a noted promoter of the concept of the bitext.

Bibliography 
 

1952 births
Living people
Canadian translators